Cold inflation pressure is the inflation pressure of tires before the car is driven and the tires(tyres) warmed up. Recommended cold inflation pressure is displayed on the owner's manual and on the placard (or sticker) attached to the vehicle door edge, pillar, glovebox door or fuel filler flap. Most passenger cars are recommended to have a tire pressure of 32 to 35 pounds per square inch when not warmed by driving. 40% of passenger cars have at least one tire under-inflated by 6 psi or more. Drivers are encouraged to make sure their tires are adequately inflated, as under inflated tires can greatly reduce fuel economy, increase emissions, cause increased wear on the edges of the tread surface, and can lead to overheating and premature failure of the tire. Excessive pressure, on the other hand, will lead to impact-breaks, decreased braking performance, and cause increased wear on the center part of the tread surface.

Tire pressure is commonly measured in psi in the imperial and US customary systems, bar, which is deprecated but accepted for use with SI or the kilopascal (kPa), which is an SI unit.

Ambient temperature affects the cold tire pressure. Cold tire absolute pressure (gauge pressure plus atmospheric pressure) varies directly with the absolute temperature, measured in kelvin.

From physics, the ideal gas law states that PV = nRT, where P is absolute pressure, T is absolute temperature, V is the volume (assumed to be relatively constant in the case of a tire), and nR is constant for a given number of molecules of gas. To understand this, assume the tire was filled when it was 300 kelvin (approximately 27 degrees Celsius or 80 degrees Fahrenheit). If the temperature varies 10% (i.e., by 30 kelvins [also 30 degrees Celsius or 54 degrees Fahrenheit]), the pressure varies 10%. So if the tire was filled at 80 °F to 32 psi (or 47 psi absolute when we add atmospheric pressure), the change would be 4.7 psi for this 30 Celsius degree change, or 0.16 psi per Celsius degree or 0.1 psi per Fahrenheit degree or 1 psi for every 10 Fahrenheit degrees.  Using SI units, that would be 1.1 kPa/K.

Hence, for a tire filled to 32 psi, the approximation usually made is that within the range of normal atmospheric temperatures and pressures:
Tire pressure increases 1 psi for each 10 Fahrenheit degree increase in temperature, or conversely decreases 1 psi for each 10 Fahrenheit degree decrease in temperature and
in SI units, tire pressure increases 1.1 kPa for each 1 Celsius degree increase in temperature, or conversely decreases 1.1 kPa for each 1 Celsius degree decrease in temperature. For tires that need inflation greater than 32 psi it might be easier to use a Rule of Thumb of 2% pressure change for a change of 10 degrees Fahrenheit.
From the table below, one can see that these are only approximations:

Variation of tire pressure with temperature in Fahrenheit and Celsius 

(Assuming atmospheric pressure is 14.696 psi, or 101.3 kPA.)

See also 

 Direct TPMS
 Tyre-pressure gauge
 Tire-pressure monitoring system

References 

Tire inflation
Pressure
Motor vehicle maintenance